The 1919 Buffalo Bisons football team represented the University of Buffalo as an independent during the 1919 college football season. Led by Art Powell in his fourth season as head coach, the team compiled a record of 0–5–1.

Schedule

References

Buffalo
Buffalo Bulls football seasons
College football winless seasons
Buffalo Bisons football